That Honey Horn Sound is an album by Al Hirt released by RCA Victor in 1965. The album was produced by Chet Atkins and arranged by Anita Kerr and Claus Ogerman.

The single "Fancy Pants" hit #47 on the Adult Contemporary chart and #9 on the Billboard Hot 100 in 1965.  The album landed on the Billboard Top LPs chart, reaching #28.

Track listing 
 "Fancy Pants" (Floyd Cramer)
 "Danny Boy" (Frederic Weatherly)	
 "Long Walk Home" (Chip Taylor)
 "The Contrary Waltz" (Tupper Saussy)
 "Fiddler on the Roof" (Jerry Bock, Sheldon Harnick)
 "None But the Lonely Heart" (Pyotr Ilyich Tchaikovsky)
 "Alley Cat" (Bent Fabric)
 "Star Dust" (Hoagy Carmichael, Mitchell Parish)
 "Butterball" (Frank Catana, Russ Damon)
 "Over the Rainbow" (E. Y. Harburg, Harold Arlen)
 "You Took Advantage of Me" (Richard Rodgers, Lorenz Hart)
 "Flowers and Candy" (Beasley Smith, Teddy Bart)

Chart positions
Album

Singles

References

1965 albums
Al Hirt albums
Albums produced by Chet Atkins
Albums arranged by Claus Ogerman
RCA Records albums